Maha Thammada, (Arakanese:မဟာသမ္မတ, whose personal name is Thado Aung (သတိုးအောင်), was a last king (r. 1782 – 1785) of the Mrauk-U Dynasty of Arakan. Last King of Arakanese Monarchy.

When Sanda Thaditha died in 1782, Nobles gathered and all in unison enthroned Thado Aung, who was a Duke of Ramree held the post of Letwemyan (လက်ဝဲမြန် အမတ်) and was the husband of niece of deceased king Sanda Thaditha. Thado Aung assumed the title of Maha Thammada Raza and ascended the throne. His queen was Saw Mae Pon (စောမယ်ပုံ). He appointed his brother in law, Kyaw Bon (ကျော်ပုံ), a general. He made his younger brother Chit Hla Shwe (ချစ်လှရွှေ) crown prince.

Reign

During the reign of Maha Thammada Raza, he could control only the capital Mrauk U and surrounding areas. Many parts of the country was under control of rebels. Among these rebels, Kyaw Htwe (ကျော်ထွေး) was the most powerful and he controlled the southern parts of Arakan.

Maha Thammada Raza tried to suppress the rebellions with the help of his general Kyaw Bon. Many rebels including Kyaw Htwe soon made peace with Maha Thammada Raza and recognized his authority. They paid tribute to Maha Thammada Raza but still maintained their lands in control.

The country enjoyed a short season of stability but it faced a severe flood in summer, 1784. These flood inundated the alluvial delta of Kaladan river for a week destroying many rice fields and killing many lives. Consequently, it crippled the economy of Arakan. Naturally, floods are followed by epidemic diseases and famine.

On 30 June 1784, Maha Thammada Raza visited the famous temple of Mahamuni Buddha. On 18 September, he held second coronation ceremony and took the title of Aggopounnyazawraza (အဂ္ဂေါပုညာဇောရာဇာ).

Burmese invasion

Meanwhile, Amarapura (Burma) was preparing for invasion of Arakan and stored up paddy secretly on mountain routes. The invasion took place in 1784. The Burmese forces led by crown prince Thado Minsaw, consisted of four divisions, totaling 30,000 men (including 2500 cavalry and 200 elephants), begun their match towards Arakan in October. Three divisions crossed the Arakan Yoma from three different passes with Thado Minsaw's division crossing the mountains from its Minbu base. The fourth was a flotilla which came up from the Indian Ocean coastline from the erstwhile British base at Negrais.

Burmese forces first tried to take southern Arakan which was controlled by Kyaw Htwe. Kyaw Htwe, Lord of Tan Lhway (တန်းလွှဲ), tried alone to resist the invading troops. He won initial success but was unsuccessful due to lack of reinforcements from other lords. Soon he faced with defeats and fled to northern Arakan with his family. Then southern Arakan including the city of Thandwe fell into hands of Burmese forces.

After taking southern Arakan, Burmese forces landed on Ramree Island which was controlled by Prince Thet San Shwe (သက်စံရွှေ). Prince Thet San Shwe also tried to drive Burmese invaders out of his lands. But, with small numbers to repel the enemy, Prince Thet San Shwe also faced defeat and fled to jungle. Then Burmese forces occupied Ramree Island and aimed for next target, Mrauk U, the capital of northern Arakan. On 31 December 1784, Burmese forces arrived and set up camp at Laungkyet, southeast of Mrauk U.

Meanwhile, Maha Thammada Raza gathered many nobles and asked their advices to deal with Burmese invasion. His brother in law, Kyaw Bon, persuaded Maha Thammada Raza to make peace with Burmese by giving his daughter to Bodawpaya. But Maha Thammada Raza did not heed the advice and tried to drive the invader off his land by force. On 31 December 1784, Maha Thammada Raza led his land and naval forces out of Mrauk U and attacked Burmese camp at Laungkyet. However he suffered a severe defeat and retreated back to the city. At the same day, his most trusted general, Kyaw Bon burned his own house and fled from the city.

When Maha Thammada Raza knew his brother in law had left him, he felt depressed and decided to abandon the royal capital. That night, at midnight, Maha Thammada Raza together with his family, his subjects, fled to Kyunthaya Island by 30 boats.

Fall of Mrauk U kingdom

1785, 1 January, the Burmese forces captured the Arakanese capital Mrauk-U and thus ended nearly five centuries of Arakanese independence. 8 days later, the Burmese forces captured Maha Thammada Raza and his family hiding in Kyunthaya Island with the help of traitors. (Only crown prince Chit Hla Shwe escaped and hid in jungle.)

After the fall of Mrauk U kingdom, looting and destruction followed. The royal palace was burned to the ground. Much of Arakan's cultural and intellectual heritage was lost. Many people were deported forcibly to Burma. The Mahamuni Buddha, the very symbol of Arakanese sovereignty, was forcibly brought to Amarapura. Arakan was annexed and ruled through four governorships (Mrauk U, Ramree, Man Aung, Thantwe), each backed by a garrison.

Death

Maha Thammada Raza and his family was brought to Amarapura. Depressed, the last king of Arakan died a captive at Amarapura two years later.

References

Bibliography
 
 
 
 

Monarchs of Mrauk-U
18th century in Burma
18th-century Burmese monarchs